Jack Lukosius (born 9 August 2000) is a professional Australian rules footballer playing for the Gold Coast Football Club in the Australian Football League (AFL).

Early life
Lukosius was born in Adelaide, South Australia. His father, Robert, is of Lithuanian origin and played professional football for Woodville-West Torrens in the SANFL. 

Jack participated in the Auskick program at Hentley and grew up playing high level Australian rules football and cricket in Adelaide for Fulham Cricket Club while attending Henley High School with future Gold Coast teammate Izak Rankine. Such was his talent in cricket, he was selected as the opening bowler for South Australia at the 2016-17 U17 national carnival but gave the sport away soon after to focus on football. He made his senior SANFL debut for Woodville-West Torrens in a 2017 preliminary final against Sturt where he finished with 12 disposals, 8 marks and 4 goals. 

Leading into his final year of junior football, Lukosius was considered a potential number 1 draft pick by many draft analysts and drew comparisons to superstar St Kilda forward Nick Riewoldt. In 2018, he played a big part in South Australia's U18 national championships victory and Henley High School's SA schools championship. He also played for Woodville's senior SANFL side but would once again play in a losing preliminary final that year. He was drafted by Gold Coast with their first selection in the 2018 national draft, which was the second pick overall.

AFL career

Statistics
 Statistics are correct to the end of round 3, 2022

|- style="background-color: #EAEAEA"
! scope="row" style="text-align:center" | 2019
|
| 41 || 21 || 3 || 4 || 183 || 54 || 237 || 90 || 44 || 0.1 || 0.2 || 8.7 || 2.6 || 11.3 || 4.3 || 2.1
|-
! scope="row" style="text-align:center" | 2020
|
| 13 || 17 || 3 || 3 || 219 || 59 || 278 || 62 || 27 || 0.2 || 0.2 || 12.9 || 3.5 || 16.4 || 3.7 || 1.6
|- style="background-color: #EAEAEA"
! scope="row" style="text-align:center" | 2021
|
| 13 || 22 || 3 || 11 || 382 || 60 || 442 || 172 || 32 || 0.1 || 0.5 || 17.4 || 2.7 || 20.1 || 7.8 || 1.5
|-
! scope="row" style="text-align:center" | 2022
|
| 13 || 3 || 3 || 2 || 29 || 6 || 35 || 14 || 7 || 1.0 || 0.7 || 9.7 || 2.0 || 11.7 || 4.7 || 2.3
|- class="sortbottom"
! colspan=3| Career
! 63
! 12
! 20
! 813
! 179
! 992
! 338
! 110
! 0.2
! 0.3
! 12.9
! 2.8
! 15.7
! 5.4
! 1.7
|}

References

External links

2000 births
Living people
Australian people of Lithuanian descent
Australian rules footballers from South Australia
Gold Coast Football Club players
Woodville-West Torrens Football Club players